Charlie Stobo (born 8 March 1995) is an Australian cricketer. He made his first-class debut for New South Wales in the 2016–17 Sheffield Shield season on 5 December 2016. He made his List A debut for Cricket Australia XI in the 2017–18 JLT One-Day Cup on 10 October 2017. After strong performances in Western Australia Premier Cricket, Stobo was called into the Western Australia squad for the 2020–21 Marsh One-Day Cup.

Domestic career
Stobo was named in the Cricket Australia XI squad for the 2017–18 JLT One-Day Cup. He made his List A debut with the side against Victoria, bowling 7 overs and conceding 57 runs in a big loss. He took his first career List A wicket in his second match, against Tasmania when he got opener Ben McDermott out for 27.

References

External links
 

1995 births
Living people
Australian cricketers
Cricket Australia XI cricketers
New South Wales cricketers
Cricketers from Sydney
Western Australia cricketers